Lyudmila Shirina (born 1 August 1948) is a Ukrainian operatic soprano, a member of the Odessa Opera and Ballet Theater.

Life 
Born in Bilozerka, Shirina played several instruments including accordion and piano. She liked gymnastics, volleyball and basketball. Shirina studied voice at the Odessa Conservatory with M. V. Golyatovskaya. She won the International Tchaikovsky Competition.

Shirina has been a member of the Odessa Opera and Ballet Theater from 1975, later also in charge of the  company. She has toured in Europe to France, Belgium, Finland, Germany, Bulgaria, Hungary, Italy and Spain, and further to Canada, Japan and Afghanistan. In 1990, she took part in a recording of a gala concert "The Golden Crown" of the second International Festival of Opera at the theatre, conducted by Vasyl Vasylenko. She appeared in Odessa in the title role of Tchaikovsky's The Maid of Orleans in 1994. 
 
In 1977, she received the Grand Prix at the International Vocal Competition in Toulouse (France). She was awarded the title People's Artist of Ukraine in 1993, and was named Chevalier of the Order of Princess Olga in 1998.

Roles 
Shirina's operatic roles include:
 Verdi
 Aida – title role
 Il trovatore – Leonora
 Un ballo in maschera – Amelia
 Otello – Desdemona
 Puccini
 Tosca – title role
 La bohème – Mimi
 Leoncavallo's Pagliacci – Nedda
 Mascagni's Cavalleria rusticana – Santuzza
 Tchaikovsky
 The Queen of Spades – Lisa
 The Maid of Orleans – title role
 Eugene Onegin – Tatiana
 Iolanta – title role
 Hulak-Artemovsky's Zaporozhets beyond the Danube – Oksana
 M. Lysenko's Natalka Poltavka – title role
 N. Arkas' Katerina – title role
 Prokofiev's Semyon Kotko – Lyubka

References

External links 

 Odessa Opera Theater browningcenter.org

Ukrainian operatic sopranos
1948 births
Living people
20th-century Ukrainian singers

Recipients of the title of People's Artists of Ukraine